This is a list of seasons played by Naft Tehran Football Club in Iranian and Asian football, from 1973 to the most recent completed season. It details the club's achievements in major competitions, and the top scorers for each season. Top scorers in bold were also the top scorers in the Iranian league that season.

Seasons

Key

P = Played
W = Games won
D = Games drawn
L = Games lost
F = Goals for
A = Goals against
Pts = Points
Pos = Final position

TFL = Tehran Football League
TFL2 = Tehran Football League's 2nd Div.
TFL3 = Tehran Football League's 3rd Div.
Div 3 = 3rd Division
Div 2 = 2nd Division
Div 2 = Azadegan League
IPL = Iran Pro League

References
Iran Premier League Stats
RSSSF database about Iranian league football.

Iranian football club seasons
Iranian football club statistics